Adavere is a small borough in Põltsamaa Parish, Jõgeva County in central Estonia. It has a population of 632 (as of 1 January 2010). Just outside the town is the 'Estonian mainland midpoint symbol denoting'.

Adavere Manor
Adavere Manor was established as an estate in the 17th century. The estate has belonged to several Baltic German aristocratic families during the centuries. The present building was constructed in 1892–1893. Some original interior details survive to this day, and Art Nouveau ceiling decorations were uncovered in 2000.

Gallery

References

External links
Põltsamaa Parish 
Adavere Manor
Adavere Primary School 

Boroughs and small boroughs in Estonia
Manor houses in Estonia
Kreis Fellin